PKF Polonia Cernăuţi was a Polish football club based in the city of Cernăuţi, Bukovina, Kingdom of Romania (now in Ukraine).

History
The club became the regional champion of Bukovina in 1926. Polonia Cernăuţi played three seasons in the Romanian Top division as follows:

 1921–22 season
 1922–23 season
 1927–28 season

In 1940, when the Soviets invaded Bukovina, the club was closed.

Every ethnicity had their own team in Chernivtsi: Romanians (Dragoş Vodă Cernăuţi), Germans (Jahn Cernăuți), Jews (Maccabi Cernăuți and Hakoah Cernăuți), Poles (Polonia Cernăuți), and Ukrainians (Dovbuș Cernăuți).

Honours

Bukovina Champions (1): 1926

References

External links
 Ukrsoccerhistory.com
 Kopanyi-myach.info

Defunct football clubs in Poland
Defunct football clubs in Romania
Sport in Chernivtsi
Association football clubs established in 1910
Association football clubs disestablished in 1940